St John's Wood is a district in the City of Westminster, London, lying 2.5 miles (4 km) northwest of Charing Cross. Traditionally the northern part of the ancient parish and Metropolitan Borough of Marylebone, it extends east to west from Regent's Park and Primrose Hill to Edgware Road, with the Swiss Cottage area of Hampstead to the north and Lisson Grove to the south.

The area is best known for Lord's Cricket Ground, home of Marylebone Cricket Club and Middlesex CCC, and is a regular international test cricket venue. It also includes Abbey Road Studios, well known through its association with the Beatles.

Origin
The area was once part of the Forest of Middlesex, an area with extensive woodland, though it was not the predominant land use.
The area's name originates, in the Manor of Lileston, one of the two manors (the other the Manor of Tyburn) served by the Parish of Marylebone.

The Manor was taken from the Knights Templar on their suppression in 1312 and passed to the Order of Knights of the Hospital of Saint John of Jerusalem whose English headquarter were at Clerkenwell Priory.

The name of the knights was applied to a former wood within the area of the Manor, which in turn gave its name to St John's Farm, the farmhouse of which is now occupied by St John's Wood Barracks.

The Priory allocated the estate to agricultural tenants as a source of produce and income. The estate remained Crown property until 21 March 1675 (1676) when Charles II granted the St John's Wood estate to Charles Henry Wotton. On 22 March 1732 (1733) City merchant Henry Samuel Eyre (1676-1754) acquired the majority of the estate, around 500 acres, from Philip Stanhope, 4th Earl of Chesterfield. The St John's Wood estate came to be known as the Eyre estate in the 19th century after it was developed by the Eyre brothers. The estate still exists, much reduced geographically.

A masterplan for the development of St John's Wood was prepared in 1794 but development did not start until 1804 when Henry Samuel Eyre II (1770–1851) and Walpole Eyre (1773–1856) held their first auction. St John's Wood developed from the early 19th century onwards. One of the first developers was James Burton.

Built environment
St John's Wood was among the first London suburbs with lower-density villa housing and frequent avenues but fewer communal garden squares. Most of the villas have since been subdivided and replaced by small apartment blocks or terraces. This pattern of development has made it one of the most expensive areas of London.

Lord's Cricket Ground, home of Middlesex County Cricket Club and Marylebone Cricket Club (MCC), is an international test cricket ground known as the Home of Cricket on account of its role as the original headquarters of cricket.

Abbey Road Studios are located on Abbey Road, where The Beatles recorded, notably the Abbey Road album, the cover of which features the band crossing the road.

RAK Studios, founded by producer Mickie Most, are located near Regent's Park. A number of notable songs were recorded there, including the Thompson Twins' "Hold Me Now", Johnny Hates Jazz's "Shattered Dreams", Kim Wilde's "Kids in America" and Big Country's "In a Big Country".  The studios have a Nubian Jak Community Trust plaque for Errol Brown, who recorded there as lead singer for Hot Chocolate.

St. John's Wood Church Grounds contains the only nature reserve in the City of Westminster. Much of the neighbourhood is covered by a conservation area, a small part of which extends into neighbouring Camden.

Wellington Hospital is the largest independent hospital in the United Kingdom.  The Hospital of St John and St Elizabeth is also nearby.

Avenue Road, which is known for its "mega mansions", was the street with the UK's most expensive home sales in 2020. In early 2021, prices for a property on the street averaged over £30.5 million.

Former

St John's Wood Barracks was the headquarters for The King's Troop, Royal Horse Artillery until 2012, when the regiment moved to Woolwich. Ananda Krishnan's Usaha Tegas conglomerate plans to develop the site.

Allitsen Road drill hall was formerly the headquarters of the 3rd County of London Yeomanry (Sharpshooters).

The St John's Wood Art School and Anglo-French Art Centre were in St John's Wood.

The former Marlborough Road tube station is on the northern end of St John's Wood and is now a power substation.

The Star (now a gastropub) was a pub for approximately two centuries.

Education

Independent
The American School in London
Arnold House School
Abercorn School
Saint Christina's Primary School
St John's Wood Pre-Preparatory School

Academy Trust and Federation
Harris Academy St John's Wood
George Eliot Primary School

State
Robinsfield Infant School
Barrow Hill Junior School

Places of worship

Christian
St John's Wood Church (Church of England)
St Mark's Church, Hamilton Terrace (Church of England)
Abbey Road Baptist Church (Baptists Together)
The Church of Our Lady (Roman Catholic)

Jewish
St John's Wood United Synagogue (United Synagogue)
The Liberal Jewish Synagogue (Liberal Judaism)
The New London Synagogue (Orthodox/Masorti)
Saatchi Shul (Orthodox)

Buddhist
Zen Centre

Transport and locales
The main London Underground station is St John's Wood, which is on the Jubilee line.  Maida Vale, Warwick Avenue and Kilburn Park are nearby on the Bakerloo line.  The nearest London Overground station is South Hampstead.  The 13, 46, 113 and N113, 139, 187, 189 and 274 bus routes transit St John's Wood.

Notable residents

Commemorative blue plaques
Sir Lawrence Alma-Tadema, OM (1836–1912),  painter, at 44 Grove End Road
Gilbert Bayes (1872–1953), sculptor, at 4 Greville Place
Sir Joseph Bazalgette, CB (1819–1891), civil engineer, at 17 Hamilton Terrace
Sir Thomas Beecham, CH (1879–1961), conductor and impresario, at 31 Grove End Road
Sir William Reid Dick, KCVO (1879–1961), sculptor, at 95a Clifton Hill
Sir George Frampton (1860–1928), sculptor, at 32 Queen's Grove
William Powell Frith (1819–1909), painter, at 114 Clifton Hill
Dame Barbara Hepworth, DBE (1903–1975) and John Skeaping (1901–1980), sculptors, at 24 St Ann's Terrace
Thomas Hood (1799–1845), poet, at 28 Finchley Road
Thomas Huxley (1825–1895), biologist, at 38 Marlborough Place
Melanie Klein (1882–1960), psychoanalyst, at 42 Clifton Hill
Dame Laura Knight (1877–1970) and Harold Knight (1874–1961), painters, at 16 Langford Place
Oskar Kokoschka (1886–1980), painter, at Eyre Court, 1 Finchley Road
Sir Charles Santley (1834–1922), opera singer, at 13 Blenheim Road
Sir Bernard Spilsbury, Kt (1877–1947), pathologist, at 31 Marlborough Hill
William Strang (1859–1921), painter and etcher, at 20 Hamilton Terrace
Marie Tussaud (1761–1850), artist, at 24 Wellington Road
C. F. A. Voysey (1857–1941), architect and designer, at 6 Carlton Hill
John William Waterhouse (1849–1917), painter, at 10 Hall Road

Other notable residents
Henry Barnett (banker and politician) was the original owner of a mansion at 100 Hamilton Terrace that Robbie Williams temporarily rented before the debut of his 2019 Christmas album song, "Idlewild", which mentions St John's Wood.
Charles Bradlaugh (National Secular Society founder) lived at 20 Circus Road, now the site of the St John's Wood Library.
Christabel Cockerell (painter) lived and worked in St John's Wood.
Leonard N. Fowles (organist/composer) was organist and choirmaster for the former St John's Wood English Presbyterian Church.
Meredith Frampton  (painter/etcher) was born in St John's Wood and attended the St John's Wood Art School.
Noel Gallagher (musician and songwriter) and Tony Hicks (musician) lived at the same address; Hicks recorded at Abbey Road Studios.
Stephen Hough (concert pianist) lives and has a practice studio in St John's Wood.
Albert Houthuesen (artist) and Catherine Dean (artist) lived in a flat at 20 Abbey Gardens in the 1930s.
Christmas Humphreys (barrister, judge and author) lived and died at 58 Marlborough Place.
Eric Idle (actor and comedian) lived in St John's Wood; Harrison Ford and Carrie Fisher stayed at his home while filming The Empire Strikes Back.
Sir John Major (former prime minister) lived in St John's Wood, was on the Marylebone Cricket Club committee and attended matches at Lord's frequently.
Stella Margetson (novelist and author) published St John’s Wood – an Abode of Love and the Arts and was the archivist for the St John's Wood Society.
Sir Paul McCartney (musician) has lived in St John's Wood since 1965.
Arthur Prince (ventriloquist) died at his home in St John's Wood.
Keith Richards (rock musician and songwriter of The Rolling Stones) lived on Carlton Hill in the 1960s, where he wrote "(I Can't Get No) Satisfaction".
Mark Ronson (DJ, songwriter, record producer and record executive), Samantha Ronson (DJ, singer and songwriter), and Charlotte Ronson (fashion designer) lived in St John's Wood as children, where their parents' home was a celebrity hangout.
Sachin Tendulkar (cricketer) has a home in St John's Wood and captained Middlesex County Cricket Club's squad in its victory in the 2014 Lord's Bicentenary Celebration match.

References

External links

History of St John's Wood

 
Areas of London
Districts of the City of Westminster
James Burton (property developer) buildings
District centres of London
Places formerly in Middlesex